The Toyota SZ engine family is a series of straight-4 piston engines with a forward-facing exhaust. Toyota Motor Manufacturing (UK) in Deeside produces SZ engines for the Yaris. All three types of the SZ engine are built in Tianjin FAW Toyota Engine Co., Ltd. (TFTE) Plant No. 1 in Xiqing District, Tianjin, China. The 2SZ-FE and 3SZ-FE variations are also manufactured by PT Astra Daihatsu Motor's Karawang Engine Plant in Indonesia.

1SZ-FE
The 1SZ-FE was jointly developed by Toyota and Daihatsu. It features VVT-i, off-set type crankshaft which reduces friction losses and narrow-angle valves.

Applications:
Toyota Yaris/Echo/Vitz

2SZ-FE
Daihatsu's internal code for this engine is labeled as K3-DE/VE and the turbocharged version as K3-VET. The engine features VVT-i (except for K3-DE model). In China, this engine is usually known as the 4A13.

Applications:
Toyota Yaris/Toyota Vitz (XP10/XP90)
Toyota Belta
Daihatsu Materia
Daihatsu Gran Max (as K3-DE)
Daihatsu YRV (as K3-VE)
Daihatsu YRV Turbo (as K3-VET)
Toyota Ractis (XP100)
Daihatsu Sirion (M100/M300) (as K3-VE)
Toyota Avanza/Daihatsu Xenia (as K3-VE)
Perodua Myvi (M300/M600) (as K3-VE)
Daihatsu Terios (first generation, 2000-2004) (as K3-VE)
Daihatsu Copen (export model for 2006-2011, as K3-VE)
Esemka Bima

3SZ-VE

First installed in 2005 on the second generation Daihatsu Terios. It features VVT-i.

Applications:
Daihatsu Terios
Daihatsu Gran Max (1.5-litre variants)
Daihatsu Luxio
Daihatsu Sirion
Daihatsu Materia / Daihatsu Coo
Toyota bB
Toyota Passo Sette
Toyota Avanza (1.5-litre variants)
Toyota Rush
Perodua Alza (M500) (2009–2022)
Perodua Myvi SE / Perodua Myvi Advance (2011–2017)
Toyota TownAce/LiteAce (2008–2020)
Toyota Vios (China)

See also

List of Toyota engines

References

SZ
Straight-four engines
Gasoline engines by model